Lorraine Newman (born 1978) is a British scriptwriter, television producer, and the executive producer of the BBC soap opera EastEnders from 2012 to 2013. Newman, who has worked on EastEnders for "nearly 20 years", received the role of executive producer when her predecessor stepped down in 2012. Newman was also the executive producer of Babs, a BBC biopic about Dame Barbara Windsor.

Career

EastEnders

Newman first began working on the BBC soap opera EastEnders aged 19 as a script secretary and, according to John Yorke (Controller of BBC Drama Production and New Talent), is the first executive producer to have "occupied every editorial role on the show".

In March 2012, it was announced that the then current executive producer of EastEnders, Bryan Kirkwood was to step down, with "experienced series producer" Newman taking over the role on a temporary basis. Kirkwood said, "I'm delighted to leave the show in the capable hands of Lorraine Newman. Lorraine has been by my side every step of the way for the last two years and knows EastEnders inside out. I wish her and the show every future success". In June 2012, it was announced that Newman would become the full-time executive producer. Newman commented, "It is an absolute honour to be taking on the role of executive producer at EastEnders on a permanent basis. I am looking forward to leading a talented creative team, cast and crew into 2013". Yorke said, "Over the last few months, Newman has steered the show through a period of considerable change, and she's done an amazing job positioning the show for one of the most exciting autumns I can remember. With her depth of experience, her passion for the programme and her commitment to talent on-screen and off, she's the perfect person to take EastEnders forward". Her first episode aired on 16 July.

As Executive Producer
One of Newman's first key tasks as temporary executive producer was to oversee production of a special episode featuring a live segment in which the character of Billy Mitchell (Perry Fenwick) carries the Olympic Torch as an official torch bearer in the 2012 Summer Olympics torch relay. Carl Doran, creative head of the BBC’s Torch coverage, revealed the London Organising Committee of the Olympic and Paralympic Games (LOCOG) and EastEnders production team had worked for two years to organise this. The episode was part of the official torch relay, meaning the torch made a special detour from London to the EastEnders set at the BBC Elstree Centre, Borehamwood. 

Billy Mitchell was also involved in one of Newman’s most controversial storylines, in which his granddaughter Lola Pearce (Danielle Harold) has her baby taken away by social worker Trish Barnes. Real-life social workers protested this "unhelpful portrayal", with the British Association of Social Workers (BASW) calling the BBC "too lazy and arrogant" to correctly portray the child protection process, and saying that the baby was taken "without sufficient grounds to do so". Bridget Robb, acting chief of the BASW, said the storyline provoked "real anger among a profession well used to a less than accurate public and media perception of their jobs".

Newman's first major cast change was reintroduction of Sharon Watts (Letitia Dean) in August 2012, which Newman revealed had been a year in the planning. Upon her return, Dean said that Newman was "very good at character insight". Ben Mitchell (Joshua Pascoe) departed in the same month  following the conclusion of the storyline of Heather Trott (Cheryl Fergison)'s murder storyline, with Newman confirming the departure of Anthony Moon (Matt Laspinskas) soon afterwards. Newman later introduced Ava Hartman (Clare Perkins), the secret daughter of Cora Cross (Ann Mitchell), and Ava's son Dexter (Khali Best), and also upgraded Poppy Meadow (Rachel Bright) from a recurring to a regular character. Major departures under Newman’s tenure include Syed Masood (Marc Elliot) and Christian Clarke (John Partridge) in November 2012  and villain Derek Branning (Jamie Foreman), killed off in the Christmas Day episode.

On 29 July 2013, Newman left the post, with Dominic Treadwell-Collins taking over. Her final episode aired on 6 December 2013  In 2018, she returned to EastEnders as a writer.

Filmography
Television

References

External links

Living people
Soap opera producers
Place of birth missing (living people)
1978 births